8C or VIII-C may refer to:
 Alfa Romeo 8C and the unrelated Alfa Romeo 8C Competizione
 Maserati 8C, a 1932 Grand Prix race car
 Stalag VIII-C, a World War II German POW camp near Sagan
 Carbon-8 (8C), an isotope of carbon
 Air Transport International, IATA code
 Eighth Cambridge Survey (8C)
 Shanxi Airlines, IATA code

See also
C8 (disambiguation)